The Raven are a band of mercenaries who are the protagonists of the Raven trilogies by James Barclay.
 Chronicles of The Raven (Dawnthief, Noonshade, Nightchild)
 Legends of The Raven (Elfsorrow, ShadowHeart, DemonStorm, Ravensoul)

Synopsis of the Raven
The Raven are band of mercenaries, from the continent of Balaia, who  are famous, with a reputation for being the best at what they do. As a result, they already have all the money they need and so the fights and missions they choose to do during the books are what they choose to do and not what they are paid to do - this means that they do what they consider to be the just and right thing to do. The Raven have been together ten years before the beginning of DawnThief, and have already lost two members named Kirst and Halyn.

Each time a member of the Raven dies, they observe their own private rituals, holding a vigil and promising never to forget the dead member.

Philosophy of the Raven
The Raven are a very close knit group of friends. They share an utter belief that they will succeed in what they choose to do simply because they are The Raven.

Their code of conduct is such that they will never commit an act of murder, never take an action without consulting the rest of the group and will trust one another with their lives.

Nothing is more important to them than their group and whilst they will fight for country, plane and the greater good of their world; it is wholly because of their love for one another that they decide on which missions to undertake.  Even then the matter is discussed by The Raven as a whole before it is acted upon and all major decisions for the group are discussed openly amongst them.

They all devote themselves entirely to each other, such that should any one of them need help then the others will let nothing stand in their way to give it, even war or death.

Members
The Unknown Warrior, also known as Sol after becoming a Protector, appears to act as the leader and tactician of the Raven. He is an extremely tall and strong man and a fearsome warrior. His preferred weapon is a two-handed sword, and his trademark is to rhythmically tap the point of his sword on the ground before battle to clear his head. He often acts as the level-headed member of the Raven, silencing them, breaking up squabbles and so on when needed. He dies during DawnThief, but the Xetesk take his soul and turn him into a Protector (magical expert warriors who are bound by magic and punished by Demons if they misbehave) who is assigned to protect Denser, his Given. Despite being banned from speaking of his previous life, Hirad recognises him through his habit of tapping his sword. The Raven eventually succeed in releasing him from his Thrall. He becomes a hero for the rest of the Protectors who also want to be freed and as a result they will refuse to attack him, which becomes convenient for the Raven in several situations. Despite no longer being a Protector, he continues to have a bond and can feel when other Protectors are nearby. One of his vows is to release the rest of his brethren. The Unknown plays a key part throughout the events of Dawnthief and Noonshade and is the first person Denser seeks assistance from during Nightchild, set 6 years after the first two books. The Unknown is now joint owner of the Rookery, the tavern where the original Raven were formed, and is married to Diera and has a baby son called Jonas. Reluctantly he joins the hunt for Lyanna.

Hirad is the Raven's other warrior, a barbarian who lives to fight. He fights with a sword and enjoys roaring during battle to intimidate the enemy and to clear his head. When around the camp fire he is the main source of banter, often riling up Ilkar and Denser. Although it does not seem it, despite all the banter and arguing he is extremely fond of the members of the Raven and we see occasional glimpses of this, notably at the end of ElfSorrow. During NoonShade he becomes the Dragonene for Sha-Kaan and looks after the dragons during their enforced exile to Balaia after the events of NoonShade.

Ilkar is the first of the Raven's mages, an elf and a Julatsan mage. During battles he usually provides defence from magical attack through a spell named SpellShield although he provides offense on many occasions as well. During the Raven's retirement he takes over the reconstruction of his ruined college, Julatsa. He leaves this to help save the NightChild but does not return due to the events during ElfSorrow. During ElfSorrow the elves' temple is ransacked by Xetesk and a statue of Yniss is damaged which causes an illness to start attacking the elves at random. It is revealed that unless the statue is repaired then all the elves will die. Ilkar unfortunately falls ill with the disease and sacrifices himself to allow the Raven escape the BlackWings and successfully repair the statue, thus ending the disease. Hirad was particularly affected by Ilkar's death and blames every Xetestian (other than Denser) and himself for Ilkar's death. During the remaining Legends of the Raven Ilkar's absence, or in some cases his presence, is keenly felt. From the dimension of the dead, he aids The Raven in their final mission to close the tear in the demon dimension which leads to Balaia

Erienne is a Dordovan mage and later Denser's wife. She provides several offensive spells for the Raven as well as HardShield to protect them from projectiles such as arrows. Her speciality are several healing spells, which the Raven often need after their battles. She has three children, all of which die. The first two are twins who are murdered by the Black Wings (individuals who believe magic is evil and kill mages as a result of this belief). The third is her child with Denser, Lyanna, who bears the One magic. She becomes the NightChild but is too young to contain her power. The Al-Drechar transfer her power to Erienne but in doing so Lyanna dies. In the Legends of the Raven Erienne is struggling to recover from her grief and her hatred of the surviving Al-Drechar. Ultimately, she must accept their help in order to control the One magic inside herself.

Sirendor Larn was one of the original members of the Raven. The lovable joker of the group, Sirendor Larn had just announced his retirement from the Raven in order to wed his fiancee at the beginning of DawnThief. Unfortunately, on the same night as his announcement he is killed by a poisoned dagger meant for Denser. Hirad takes the death of his best friend very hard, and it takes him a long time before he can forgive Denser for Sirendor's death.

Ras, Richmond and Talan join The Raven after the deaths of Kirst and Halyn, six years before DawnThief begins, as an already established group of warrior mercenaries. Ras dies in the battle at the very beginning of the first book. Richmond dies later on in DawnThief during a raid of the Blackwing's fortress. After the loss of both of his friends, Talan's grief and fear get the better of him and he confesses to Hirad that he can no longer fight with the Raven. He isn't mentioned again in the Raven books.

Denser is the third Raven mage. He belongs to the Dark College of Mage, Xetesk. During the Unknown Warriors time as a Protector, he is the Unknown's Given. Initially he is not a member of the Raven, but slowly becomes closer and closer to them until his allegiance switches away from his college and he becomes a member of the Raven. He falls in love with and later marries Erienne. He is proficient at casting many offensive spells. After casting DawnThief he attains a clearer understanding of mana and thus becomes one of the best mages on Balaia (Ilkar and Erienne also being in this league).

Will Begman is a thief who is introduced during DawnThief who joins and helps the Raven. He fights with two small daggers. Sadly, Will dies during NoonShade, after being traumatised from a battle with Demons.

Thraun is a shapechanger, who can change between being a man and a wolf. His best friend is Will and he joins the Raven at the same time. Will is the only man he trusts to bring him back from being a wolf, which Will does by saying the word 'Remember' to him. He is a very strong man, a good fighter and as a wolf extremely dangerous. He is almost invulnerable due to being a shapechanger. Emotionally, he has a very rough ride during the books. He blames himself for Will's death and changes to a wolf to escape his guilt and grief. After 6 years, his wolf pack also die and again he also blames himself. Full of grief and guilt he retreats back into his human form. Due to his long period as a wolf he has almost forgotten his human self and does not fully return to human form at first. Mentally his return to his old self takes much longer.

Jandyr joins the Raven along with Will and Thraun, and fills the much desired position of elven bowman. His enhanced elven sight means that he barely ever misses his targets. However, towards the end of DawnThief he receives a terrible injury whilst protecting Will, and this inevitably leads to his death in the last battle due to his weakened state.

Aeb is a Protector who is Denser's Given during ElfSorrow and close to Sol through a bond from his time as a Protector. He becomes a member of the Raven. Eventually Xetesk choose reassign him away from Denser. He chooses to rebel against his masters in order to aid the Raven, which leads to his death.

Darrick is the (ex-)general of the army belonging to the college of Lystern, and known as the best military man on Balaia. He rebels and deserts the army in protest of their alliance with Dordover when he learns they in turn are allied with the Black Wings. He decides his conscience would be better served by joining the Raven. He continues to feel for Lystern and on occasion he offers their new general advice in order to protect the lives of his men. Although he has committed treason by deserting, many of his men feel sympathy for his decision and his replacement will listen to his advice rather than arrest him, as he should do.

Ren is an elf from Calaius and a member of the Guild of Drech, which look after the Al'Drechar. She appears in NightChild and aids Erienne during her journey to get the Raven to help herself, the Al'Drechar and Lyanna. She falls in love with Ilkar and joins the Raven, but dies at the end of ElfSorrow while protecting the Raven.

Related Characters 
Lyanna is the daughter of Erienne and Denser. She is the conceived during the events of DawnThief and born before NightChild. She is the NightChild after which this book is known, and dies at the end of this book.

Diera and Jonas are the Unknown Warrior's wife and son. They are first mentioned in NightChild, with the Unknown Warrior marrying Diera during his brief retirement between the end of NoonShade and the start of NightChild.

Tomas is a close friend of the Unknown Warrior. Together, they run The Rookery, an inn in Korina (the capital of Balaia. During his temporary retirement he returns to run the inn with Tomas.

Rebraal is Ilkar's older brother, who we meet in ElfSorrow. The brothers have not seen each other for a hundred years, and Rebraal presumed him dead. Rebraal is a member of the Al-Arynaar who protect the temple at Aryndeneth.

Characters in fantasy literature
Fictional mercenaries
Lists of literary characters